AB Nyköpings Automobilfabrik (ANA) founded in 1937 was an automobile manufacturer in Nyköping, Sweden that assembled trucks from Chrysler, DeSoto, Plymouth, Fargo and later also Škoda and Standard and from the mid-1950s also Simca. From 1946 they also sold Piper aircraft. The company was founded as a daughter company of Nordiska Kompaniet. During the 1960s the company distributed Massey Ferguson tractors, developing a modified version of the Ferguson hitch called the Swedish Hitch.

In 1960, the company was bought by SAAB and renamed SAAB-ANA and changed into being a SAAB dealership. In 2013 ANA started selling BMW and Mini and they had since a few years also made police versions of BMW cars and motorcycles. Some production re-emerged when NEVS bought the bankruptcy estate and in 2016 NEVS announced that the brand name Saab would cease.  Hedin bil bought Ana motorcentrum AB 2017 on July 2 and car sales and workshop services continued under the name Trollhättan AB and Hedin bil in Lysekil

See also

References 

Defunct motor vehicle manufacturers of Sweden
Saab
Swedish companies established in 1937